The 1986 Bavarian State Election was held on 12 October 1986 to elect members of the 11th Landtag of Bavaria. The Christian Social Union (CSU) led by Minister-President Franz Strauss retained its majority. The SPD fell below 30% of the vote for the first time since the 1954 state elections, while for the first time the Bavarian Greens won seats in the Landtag.

Parties
The table below lists parties represented in the 10th Landtag of Bavaria.

Election result

|-
! colspan="2" | Party
! Votes
! %
! +/-
! Seats 
! +/-
! Seats %
|-
| bgcolor=| 
| align=left | Christian Social Union (CSU)
| align=right| 6,333,734
| align=right| 55.8
| align=right| 2.5
| align=right| 128
| align=right| 5
| align=right| 62.7
|-
| bgcolor=| 
| align=left | Social Democratic Party (SPD)
| align=right| 3,119,124
| align=right| 27.5
| align=right| 4.4
| align=right| 61
| align=right| 10
| align=right| 28.4
|-
| bgcolor=| 
| align=left | The Greens (Grüne)
| align=right| 854,353
| align=right| 7.5
| align=right| 2.9
| align=right| 15
| align=right| 15
| align=right| 7.4
|-
! colspan=8|
|-
| bgcolor=| 
| align=left | Free Democratic Party (FDP)
| align=right| 428,790
| align=right| 3.8
| align=right|  .3
| align=right| 0
| align=right| ±0
| align=right| 0
|-
|-
| bgcolor=| 
| align=left | The Republicans (REP)
| align=right| 342,995
| align=right| 3.0
| align=right|  3.0
| align=right| 0
| align=right| ±0
| align=right| 0
|-
| 
| align=left | Others
| align=right| 275,245
| align=right| 2.4
| align=right| 
| align=right| 0
| align=right| ±0
| align=right| 0
|-
! align=right colspan=2| Total
! align=right| 11,354,241
! align=right| 100.0
! align=right| 
! align=right| 204
! align=right| ±0
! align=right| 
|-
! align=right colspan=2| Voter turnout
! align=right| 
! align=right| 70.1
! align=right| 7.9
! align=right| 
! align=right| 
! align=right| 
|-
|colspan=8 align=left|Source: Statistik Bayern and Historisches Lexikon Bayerns 
|}

Sources
 Historisches Lexikon Bayerns
 Bayerisches Landesamt für Statistik

Bavaria
1990
1986 in Bavaria
October 1986 events in Europe